The 1995–96 Australian Athletics Championships was the 74th edition of the national championship in outdoor track and field for Australia. It was held from 7–10 March 1996 at the Sydney Olympic Park Athletic Centre in Sydney. It served as a selection meeting for Australia at the 1996 Summer Olympics. The 10,000 metres event took place separately at the Zatopek 10K on 14 December 1995 at Lakeside Stadium in Melbourne.

Medal summary

Men

Women

References

External links 
 Athletics Australia website

1996
Australian Athletics Championships
Australian Championships
Athletics Championships
Sports competitions in Sydney
1990s in Sydney